Aeollanthus saxatilis is a species of plant in the mint family, Lamiaceae. It is endemic to the Katangan Copperbelt in Katanga Province, Democratic Republic of the Congo. It is an absolute metallophyte, living on rocky steppes with copper-rich soils. It is threatened by surface mining activities.

References

Lamiaceae
Near threatened plants
Endemic flora of the Democratic Republic of the Congo